IRCC may refer to:

 Indian River Community College, a two-year community college in Fort Pierce, Florida
 Iraqi Revolutionary Command Council, the ultimate decision making body in Iraq before the 2003 Invasion of Iraq
 Immigration, Refugees and Citizenship Canada, a department of the Canadian federal government.
 Institute for Research and Cure of Cancer, in Candiolo, Italy